The Arnon is a  long river in central France. It is a left tributary of the river Cher. Its source is near the village of Préveranges, west of Montluçon. Its longest tributary is the Théols. The Arnon flows generally north, through the following departments and towns:

 Allier 
 Cher: Culan, Lignières, Chârost
 Indre: Reuilly

The Arnon flows into the river Cher near Vierzon.

References

Rivers of France
Rivers of Auvergne-Rhône-Alpes
Rivers of Centre-Val de Loire
Rivers of Allier
Rivers of Cher (department)
Rivers of Indre